Hicham Dmaei (born 11 January 1971) is a Moroccan footballer. He played in five matches for the Morocco national football team from 1991 to 1996. He was also named in Morocco's squad for the 1992 African Cup of Nations tournament.

References

External links
 

1971 births
Living people
Moroccan footballers
Morocco international footballers
1992 African Cup of Nations players
Place of birth missing (living people)
Association football defenders
Kawkab Marrakech players
Footballers at the 1992 Summer Olympics
Olympic footballers of Morocco